Mantua is a census-designated place (CDP) in Fairfax County, Virginia, United States. Mantua is a bedroom community serving as a suburb to the Washington, D.C. metropolitan area. Most of the homes in Mantua were built between the 1950s and the 1980s. The population was 7,503 at the 2020 census.

Geography
Mantua is located in central Fairfax County at  (38.852012, −77.257675). It is bordered to the west by the city of Fairfax, to the north by Merrifield, to the east by Woodburn, to the southeast by Wakefield, and to the south by Long Branch. The northern border of the CDP follows U.S. Route 50 (Arlington Boulevard), the southern border follows Virginia State Route 236 (Little River Turnpike), and the eastern border follows Prosperity Avenue.

Accotink Creek, a tributary of the Potomac River, flows through the northern part of the CDP, and Crook Branch, a tributary of Accotink Creek, flows through the southern part.

History

Texaco oil leak
At the time, the distribution plant was owned in part by a subsidiary of Texaco. The oil leakage may have occurred over up to twenty-five years, as the distribution plant had opened in April 1965. Four families were evacuated, and approximately 100 homes were connected to public water and sewer lines. The Environmental Protection Agency (EPA) directed the installation of a "pump-and-treat" groundwater remediation system, which was augmented in 2000 by digging of horizontal infiltration wells, intended to wash contaminated groundwater into the remediation system. Storm sewers in the area were checked for leaks and relining was performed to prevent further contamination of surface water. By 2013, a four-year temporary shutdown test had shown that benzene vapor intrusion in homes directly above the contaminated groundwater plume did not exceed the screening limit, and that groundwater contamination east of the distribution plant had fallen to levels controllable by natural degradation. The offsite remediation system was removed by 2016, but cleanup at the distribution plant is ongoing. The oil distribution plant remains in operation as of 2023 using nine reinforced surface tanks, despite objections that community members and a task force appointed by Governor L. Douglas Wilder had raised at the time the leak was being investigated. All underground tanks have since been removed and piping for trucks to discharge oil residual into at the loading rack was installed in 1991: both the underground tanks and the loading rack had been suspected sources of the leak. Groundwater in the Crook Branch watershed continues to be tested annually by the EPA and storm sewers are inspected for cracks.

Demographics

As of the 2010 census, there were 7,135 people, 2,628 households, and 1,936 families residing in the CDP. The population density was 3,031.0 people per square mile. The racial makeup of the CDP was 73.5% White, 19.7% Asian, 2.6% African American, 0.3% Native American, 1.2% from other races, and 2.7% from two or more races. Hispanics and Latinos of any race were 6.2% of the population.

The median age was 46.1 years. 25.6% of the population was under the age of 18, 6.3% was 18 to 24, 18.6% was 25 to 44, 31.7 was 45 to 64, and 17.8% were 65 years of age or older. The gender makeup of the community was 48.2% male and 51.8% female.

The median income for a household in the CDP was $112,008. About 3.8% of families and 5.2% of the population were below the poverty line, including 6.6% of those under the age of 18 and 7.2% of those 65 and older.

Education

Primary and secondary schools

Public schools
The Mantua/Frost/Woodson School Pyramid is highly desired. Mantua's former principal, Jan-Marie Fernandez, was awarded the "2010 National Distinguished Principal for Virginia" and Woodson HS is ranked #280 in U.S. News & World Report's National Rankings.

The community is served by the Fairfax County Public Schools. Schools serving Mantua include:

Elementary schools serving Mantua include:
 Mantua Elementary School
 Fairhill Elementary School

Secondary schools serving Mantua include:
 Frost Middle School
 Woodson High School

In addition, some Frost students may gain acceptance to Thomas Jefferson High School for Science and Technology, often ranked in the top five high schools in America.

Private schools

Nearby private schools include:
 Gesher Jewish Day School of Northern Virginia (K-8)
 St. Ambrose Catholic School (K-8)

Notable residents
Gerry Connolly, member of the United States House of Representatives
Stephen E. Gordy, member of the Virginia House of Delegates
Augusto and Michaela Odone, subjects of the 1992 film Lorenzo's Oil starring Nick Nolte and Susan Sarandon
Lorenzo Odone, notable ALD patient

References

External links

 Mantua.org

Census-designated places in Fairfax County, Virginia
Census-designated places in Virginia
Washington metropolitan area